= Thapovanam, Shelter of Hope, Sulthan Bathery =

Thapovanam, Shelter of Hope, Sulthan Bathery Wayanad, Kerala, India is an endeavor of the Eparchy of Sulthan Bathery. The house is a rehabilitation centre for the mentally ill persons. Geevarghese Mar Divannasios, the Bishop of Sulthan Bathery founded the in 2002. Rev. Fr. Wilson Kochupilackal is the founder-director of this house.
